The 1984 Washington State Cougars football team was an American football team that represented Washington State University in the Pacific-10 Conference (Pac-10) during the 1984 NCAA Division I-A football season. In their seventh season under head coach Jim Walden, the Cougars compiled a 6–5 record (4–3 in Pac-10, fifth), and were outscored 319 to 317.

The team's statistical leaders included Mark Rypien with 1,927 passing yards, Rueben Mayes with 1,637 rushing yards, and John Marshall with 534 receiving yards. In late October, Mayes rushed for 357 yards at Oregon to set an NCAA record.

With a change in the academic calendar, classes now started at WSU a month earlier, in late August. All home games were played on campus at Martin Stadium, with none at Joe Albi Stadium in Spokane.

Schedule

Roster

Season summary

Oregon

    
    
    
    
    
    
    
    
    
    
    
    
    
    
    
    

Statistics
Rueben Mayes 39 att, 357 yards

NFL Draft

Two Cougars were selected in the 1985 NFL Draft.

References

Washington State
Washington State Cougars football seasons
Washington State Cougars football